This is a list of dark nebulae (absorption nebulae), also called "dark clouds".

List
E Nebula (Barnard 142 and 143)
Barnard 68, possibly the closest to Earth at about 400 light-years.
Bernes 157 (Sandqvist and Lindroos, SL 39-41), another close dark nebula of the Corona Australis Molecular Cloud, which includes NGC 6729

Named absorption nebulae
See also the references to names from other cultures at dark cloud constellations:

Coalsack Nebula
Cone Nebula
Dark Doodad Nebula
Dark Horse Nebula
Horsehead Nebula (Barnard 33)
Pipe Nebula (also see Dark Horse Nebula; includes Barnard 59, 77 and 78)
Snake Nebula (also see Dark Horse Nebula)
 Keyhole Nebula

Barnard objects

See also
Lists of astronomical objects
Dark nebula constellation
Nebula
Dark nebulae
Bok globules

External links
East Valley Astronomical Society Barnard Dark Nebulae Observing Program
Barnard's Catalog

List
Dark nebulae